The Yunnan fulvetta (Alcippe fratercula) is a species of bird in the family Alcippeidae. It is endemic to southern China, southeastern Myanmar and northern Indochina.

Its natural habitat is subtropical or tropical moist montane forest.

References

Yunnan fulvetta
Birds of Yunnan
Yunnan fulvetta